Lisanne Norman (born 15 February 1951 in Glasgow, Scotland) is a science fiction author. She is best known as the author of The Sholan Alliance series. She was trained as a teacher.

Bibliography
Turning Point, Book 1 of the Sholan Alliance series, first published December 1993, 
Fortune's Wheel, Book 2 of the Sholan Alliance series, first published August 1995, 
Fire Margins, Book 3 of the Sholan Alliance series, first published November 1996, 
Razor's Edge, Book 4 of the Sholan Alliance series, first published December 1997, 
Dark Nadir, Book 5 of the Sholan Alliance series, first published March 1999, 
Stronghold Rising, Book 6 of the Sholan Alliance series, first published June 2000, 
Between Darkness and Light, Book 7 of the Sholan Alliance series, first published January 2003, 
Shades of Gray, Book 8 of the Sholan Alliance series, first published August 2010, 
Circle's End, Book 9 of the Sholan Alliance series, first published September 2017

References

External links
 Official Page

1951 births
Living people
Writers from Glasgow
British science fiction writers
Scottish science fiction writers
Scottish women writers
Women science fiction and fantasy writers
British women novelists